Robert Hunt may refer to:

Sportspeople
 Bobby Hunt (American football) (born 1940), American football defensive back
 Rob Hunt (American football) (born 1981), American football offensive lineman
 Robert Hunt (American football, born 1996), American football offensive lineman
 Robert Hunt (American football coach) (born 1975), American football offensive lineman and coach
 Bobby Hunt (footballer, born 1934), English football wing half
 Bobby Hunt (footballer, born 1942), English football forward
 Rob Hunt (footballer) (born 1995), English football fullback
 Robert Hunt (cricketer) (1915–2010), English cricketer
 Robert Hunt (rugby union) (born 1996), South African rugby union player

Others
 Robert Hunt (chaplain) (c. 1568–1608), chaplain of the English expedition that founded Jamestown, Virginia, in 1607
 Robert Hunt (colonial administrator), English governor of the Providence Island colony from 1636 to 1638
 Robert Hunt (scientist) (1807–1887), English scientist in mineralogy and mining
 Robert Hunt (critic) (fl.1809), English writer
 Robert H. Hunt (1839–1908), Union Army Colonel during the American Civil War and mayor of Kansas City, Missouri
 Robert Hunt (illustrator) (born 1952), American illustrator and painter
 Robert W. Hunt (1838–1923), American metallurgical engineer
 Robert Hunt (actor), American musical theater actor in Boobs! The Musical
 Robert Hunt (Parliamentarian) (c. 1609–1680), English lawyer and politician
 Robert Hunt (police officer) (1935–2013), British police officer
 Robert L. Hunt (born 1933), fisheries biologist
 Robert M. Hunt (1828–1902), American physician in California
 Robert O. Hunt (1873–?), American politician
 Robert Hunt (poet) (1906–1964), poet and partner of Witter Bynner